Nurbanu Sultan ("Queen of light",  1525 – 7 December 1583) was Haseki Sultan of the Ottoman Empire as the principal consort of Sultan Selim II  (reign 1566–1574), his legal wife, as well as Valide Sultan (empress mother) as the mother of Sultan Murad III (reign 1574–1583). She was one of the most prominent figures during the time of the Sultanate of Women. Conflicting theories describe her as of Venetian, Jewish or Greek origin. Her birth name may have been Cecilia Venier-Baffo, Rachel or Kalē Kartanou.

Theories about her origin 
There are several theories about the ethnic roots of Nurbanu. Although no theory is definitively demonstrated, that of Venetian origins is both the best known and the most accredited and which receives the greatest consensus among historians.

Cecilia Venier-Baffo 
In 1900, Emilio Spagni claimed that she was a Venetian patrician, daughter of Nicolò Venier and Violanta Baffo, abducted on Paros when it was captured by Ottoman admiral Hayreddin Barbarossa in the Third Ottoman-Venetian War. The Sultana, herself, would often say she was of Venetian patrician descent, but never named her family. The opinion that Nurbanu Sultan was Cecilia Venier-Baffo has been followed by Franz Babinger in his article about Nurbanu Sultan for Dizionario Biografico degli Italiani.

Kale Kartanou 
In 1992, historian Benjamin Arbel proposed a new theory, that Nurbanu was a Greek from Corfu named Kale Kartanou, daughter of Nikolas Kartanos, and that she was abducted from the island in 1538. According to this theory, Venetian senators arbitrarily chose to create a new identity for her as Cecilia Venier-Baffo, and she adopted it for political and material gains. This theory has been accepted by Italian historian Maria Pia Pidani, and Turkish historian Emrah Safa Gürkan, among others. According to the latter historian, the fact that she "forge[d] a trans-imperial link in order to ingratiate herself with the Venetians suggests that the Ottomans, too, considered the common background as a diplomatic asset".

Jewish origin 
Turkish historian Ahmet Refik believed she was of Jewish descent, as did other Turkish historians.

Early life
Nurbanu who was said to be prominent in the palace with her beauty and extraordinary intelligence, was sent to Manisa as one of the girls of the harem of Şehzade Selim in 1543, and she gave him a son, Murad, next Sultan of the Ottoman Empire after his father, and four daughters.

Haseki Sultan
Nurbanu became the most favored consort of Şehzade Selim (who became Ottoman Sultan as Selim II in 1566), and the mother of Şehzade Murad (the future Murad III, born 1546).

While her spouse Selim was still a şehzade, Nurbanu was the head of his princely harem at Manisa.

Once he became sultan, Selim let his favorite wife, the haseki Nurbanu, remain at the Topkapı Palace throughout his reign, as his predecessor (Suleiman the Magnificent) had done.

Even after Selim began to take other concubines, Nurbanu persisted as a favorite for her beauty and intelligence. As the mother of the heir-apparent, she acted as an advisor to her husband. Although it was far from normal at the time, Selim II would often ask Nurbanu for her advice on various subjects because of his respect for her good judgment. The Venetian ambassador Jacopo Soranzor reported:  She became a formidable figure with far-reaching influence during this time. According to some sources (mostly Venetian accounts), her influence was such that Nurbanu Sultan effectively ran the government alongside the Grand Vizier Sokollu Mehmed Pasha. Selim handed over almost all of his power to Sokollu, who did indeed rule the empire in his stead. Nurbanu did not intervene directly in politics, however there is no doubt that she consulted regularly with Sokollu. The Ottoman Empire was far from stable at the top, and clashes over the imperial throne were common. It was also not unusual for the loser in such contests to be massacred along with his entire family to prevent any future challenges. Nurbanu Sultan was determined, however, that when the time came for her son to succeed his father, nothing would interfere.
When Selim II's reign ended in 1574, the haseki Nurbanu received 1,100 aspers a day, while Selim's other consorts, each the mother of a son, received only 40 aspers. In addition, Selim repeatedly, publicly stated that Murad was his heir, thus securing the position of his firstborn son and sentencing his other sons to death.

Selim, to emphasize that there was only one woman for him, also legally married Nurbanu. Ambassadorial accounts date the marriage to the beginning of 1571 and conveyed the news with the remark that Selim wanted to express by marriage how much he loved Nurbanu and that his only legitimate heir was their son, Murad.

Valide Sultan 

Şehzade Murad had been sent to serve as Governor of Manisa on the Aegean coast and was there when Sultan Selim II died in 1574. Nurbanu first learned the news and then ordered everyone to keep their mouths shut.  She did not share the sultan's death with anyone other than Sokollu Mehmed Pasha, Grand Vezir. Her goal was to allow her son Murad to arrive to Istanbul in secret before anyone could take advantage of the situation. This is usually considered correct because this would have been the perfect opportunity for someone to seize power with the Sultan dead and his son away from the capital. Nurbanu realized this as much, if not more, than anyone and took quick action. Security and privacy in the harem were the most strict anywhere and no one knew when Selim II had actually died. Nurbanu told no one and hid the dead body of her husband in an icebox and sent word to Manisa for her son to come to Constantinople immediately. All the while no one was the wiser that Selim had died. It was not made known publicly until twelve days later when Murad arrived and Nurbanu delivered up Selim's body. Her son became sultan and Nurbanu became valide sultan, the highest position a woman could hold in the Ottoman Empire.

Nurbanu's real influence began at this time, she enjoyed absolute power between 1574 and 1583, although she was apparently not resident in the Palace after Selim II's death. Although in the past she also had influence over many things as a Haseki, she mostly just supported Selim from the background and gradually built up her own circles for the future. However, as a valide, she immediately started to work and put her own trusted people in ever higher positions to strengthen herself and her son through them. She was revered as Valide-i Atik Sultan ("the first strong mother of the reigning sultan") during her son's reign until her death.

Nurbanu became the first woman to hold both the rank of Haseki and Valide. Although the Valide Sultan rank has existed since the reign of Bayezid II, it was Murad III who, for the sake of his mother, Nurbanu, transformed it into a legal registered position. This means that previously the Valide Sultan was only listed as “Mother of Sultan,” in every list. But thanks to Murad, the mother of the sultan acquired a formal title, that of valide sultan. With her formal title, the valide sultan joined the ranks of the most exalted officials of the empire, whose status was acknowledged by the omission of their personal names from their title. Thus, instead of “mother of Sultan Murad III,” Nurbanu has already been referred to as “Nurbanu Valide Sultan.” And with this change, not only did valide carry out the usual responsibilities according to tradition, but its tasks and possibilities also increased significantly.

Nurbanu, with all her influence over her son, was involved in governing, and the Sultan himself did not seem to have a say in his rule. Murad felt immeasurable respect and love for his mother, perhaps no other sultan was as devoted to his mother as Murad. Murad asked his mother for her opinion in everything, and he took her advice. They managed to do all this in such a way that Murad's rank, authority and influence remained unquestionable. 

Nurbanu did not seek to rule through her son, but merely helped her child to become a just and worthy sultan, who is loved, accepted and respected by the people. In this way, the valide became a high status and became an important and powerful position of the dynasty.  Nurbanu's pocket money, which reached high amounts among both dynastic members and high level officials, is considered as an indicator of this power.  As valide sultan she was allocated 2000 coins daily.

Also because of her absolute and ultimate authority through her son, her favorites, Canfeda Hatun, Raziye Hatun, and Hubbi Hatun trusted ladies-in-waiting to Murad and Nurbanu also appear to have been very powerful and influential during his reign.

The rivalry with Safiye 
Of all the sultans, Murad was the most devoted to his mother. However, Nurbanu's monopoly and superiority was still threatened. Murad didn't keep many consorts, and was committed to a single woman, Safiye. Safiye Sultan was given the rank of Haseki as soon as Murad became Sultan, and thus became an influential sultana, albeit very much less than Nurbanu.

Safiye herself wanted to have a say in state affairs, so she tried to influence Murad, which in turn provoked Nurbanu's dislike. Her attempts were in vain, as Murad never listened to any woman but his mother. The details of the struggle between Safiye and Nurbanu are not known, but they probably had conflicts within the harem, for in 1582 their hostility peaked. 

To avoid the danger of dynastic extinction, it would have been logical for Safiye to gave birth to more children, but she had been unable to get pregnant for years at that time. In the cases where she had become pregnant, she had a miscarriage or the child was born premature and subsequently died. Murad, however, refused to accept new concubines due to the fact that he loved Safiya strongly — so much so he was not able to perform sexually with anyone else. Nurbanu then devised a plan and accused Safiye of using black magic to make the sultan impotent. The rumor began to spread throughout the city, and Murad eventually exiled Safiye to the Old Palace due to his self-esteem. Doctors eventually solved Murad's impotence, who then produced dozens of children in the following years.

Nurbanu may have felt that she had finally got rid of Safiye, but she could not win this fight so easily. Her grandson, Mehmed, openly disagreed with both her and the Sultan for the sake of his mother, Safiye. As a matter of fact, the sources clearly suggest that Nurbanu was afraid that Mehmed would anger Murad until Murad executed him. Although Nurbanu did not like Safiye, she loved Mehmed as she did all her grandchildren. This is clearly indicated by a follow-up report from 1582. According to this, after Mehmed’s circumcision, he impregnated one of Nurbanu's servants, which was forbidden, since the girl was a member of Murad's harem, not Mehmed’s. Since Mehmed was already in a very bad relationship with his father, Nurbanu killed the girl to hide the news from Murad. Murad seemingly never realised what had happened and was able to finally restore his relationship with Mehmed.

Nurbanu died suddenly in 1583, and less than two years later, in early 1585, Safiye regained her husband's trust and love. She and her exiled daughters returned to the royal harem. Thus Safiye regained enough power and influence, or far more than before, to protect her son and prepare for his reign. Safiye, like Nurbanu and her predecessor Hurrem Sultan, was able to build a circle of supporters alongside herself and her son and drive out the opposition. Even after Murad’s death in January 1595, Safiye, like her late mother-in-law Nurbanu, hid the death of the Sultan until the arrival of her son to Constantinople.

Foreign politics 
After Nurbanu became the valide sultan to her son Murad III, she effectively managed the government together with the Grand Vizier Sokollu Mehmed Pasha, who acted as co-regent with the sultan during the Sultanate of Women.

Her intermediary to the world outside the harem was her "Kira", Esther Handali. She corresponded with the queen Catherine de' Medici of France.

It is understood that Nurbanu Sultan used Kira Ester Handali of Jewish origin for her own personal affairs and had a financial relationship with Duke of Naxos Joseph Nasi.  Perhaps, due to this network of relationships, the rumor has spread that she was of Jewish origin.  Among her close men are Bâbüssaâde Ağası Gazanfer Ağa, the priest Şemsi Pasha, the strong figures of the harem that have been with her since Manisa, Canfeda Hatun and Raziye Hatun. Extensive information is available in the envoy reports about Nurbanu Sultan's close political diplomatic contact with the Venetians. In 1583, the Venice senate agreed to send her a gift worth 2000 Venetian gold for her useful services. According to another report, she prevented the possible Ottoman attack on Crete and warned Captain Ali Pasha about not opening a war on Venice.

Venetian accounts are the most prolific in describing Nurbanu Sultan as a woman who never forgot her Venetian origins. Reportedly, she kept in contact with Venice through her lady-in-waiting Chirana, who kept in regular contact with the Council of Ten in Venice, from whom she (Chirana) received an allowance as a Venetian Agent.

During her nine years of co-regency (1574–1583), her politics were so pro-Venetian that she was hated by the Republic of Genoa. Some have even suggested that she was poisoned by a Genoese agent. In any case, she died at the palace in the Yenikapı Quarter, Istanbul on 7 December 1583.

Patroness of architecture

This mosque complex was constructed by Mimar Sinan on a vast area. The component buildings in the complex were established on a number of successive and stepped flat levels. Buildings were constructed as the mosque, medresse, school, and the dervish lodge on two separate plains. To the west of these, on a lower flat level were erected the complex of buildings designed to meet social functions such as charity. The public bath is in the south.

The Darüşşifa (hospital), is an integral part of the mosque complex constructed by Mimar Sinan, the great Ottoman architect, under the auspices of Nurbanu Sultan between 1570 and 1579. The landed properties that Nurbanu Sultan devoted to the darüşşifa in her mosque complex are scattered over many corners of Istanbul, Rumelia, and Anatolia. Through the revenues remitted from these resources the treatments and needs of patients admitted to the darüşşifa were sponsored. A section specialized in the administration of revenues was also included in the darüşşifa premises.

During her nine years of regency, Nurbanu ordered the renowned Ottoman architect Mimar Sinan to build the Atik Valide Mosque and its surrounding külliye at the district of Üsküdar in Istanbul, where previously a "Jewish bath" was located. The construction of the külliye was completed and put in commission at the end of 1583, just before the demise of Nurbanu on 7 December 1583.

The Atik Valide Complex comprises a mosque, medrese, primary school, convent for mystics, schools for Qur’an recitation and hadith scholars, soup kitchen, hospital, and bathhouse. Mimar Sinan conceived of his major mosques as finely tuned instruments meant to sound the Qur’an as a text-as-event, in a reenactment of the original revelation. He even integrated sounding vessels in the domes to ensure a beautiful performance of the holy text. Based on the endowment deed (vakfiye), one can reconstruct the soundscape Nurbanu created through her patronage.

Nurbanu Sultan has also constructed imaret and bathhouse, which she built in Mercan, Alemdağ and Langa, in Istanbul, she was the first Ottoman woman to built a library in this complex. The stone needed during the construction of this mosque and complex was obtained from places close to Istanbul such as Iznik and Gallipoli, wooden Sapanca and Iznik.

She was buried at the mausoleum of her husband Selim II located inside the Hagia Sophia (then a mosque) at Sultanahmet in Istanbul, Turkey.

Death 

Nurbanu died at Istanbul on 7 December 1583, during the reign of her son Murad III. She was buried next to Selim II in his türbe (mausoleum) in the courtyard of Hagia Sophia, thus becoming the first wife of a Sultan to receive the honor of being laid to rest next to her spouse.

Nurbanu Sultan attracted great respect not only during her life but also after her death. As against the norm that sultans remained in the palace during the funeral procession, Murad III accompanied his mother's corpse, both walking and crying, up to the Fatih mosque where her burial service was to be read. The farthest sultanic mosque from the imperial palace, i.e., the Fatih Mosque, was assigned for the funeral rite. This choice not only enabled as many people as possible to give their blessing to the soul of Nurbanu Sultan but also maintained the extensive appreciation of this religious respect paid to her by the residents of the imperial capital. 

Preceding Nurbanu's death, the Venetian ambassador in the Ottoman palace, Paolo Contarini had stated  When Nurbanu died in December 1583, the successor of Contarini reported the following:

Issue 
With Selim, Nurbanu had five children, four daughters and a son:
 Şah Sultan (Manisa, 1544 – Constantinople, 3 November 1580, buried in Zal Mahmud Paşa Mausoleum, Eyüp), married firstly in 1562 to Damad Hasan Aga, married secondly in 1575 to Damad Zal Mahmud Pasha.
 Gevherhan Sultan (1544/1545, Manisa Palace, Manisa – 1624, Istanbul, buried in Selim II Mausoleum, Hagia Sophia Mosque), married firstly in 1562 to Damat Piyale Pasha, married secondly to Damad Cerrah Mehmed Pasha. 
 Ismihan Sultan (1545, Manisa – 8 August 1585, Istanbul, buried in Selim II Mausoleum, Hagia Sophia Mosque), married firstly in 1562 to Damad Sokollu Mehmed Pasha, married secondly in 1584 to Damad Kalaylıkoz Ali Pasha.
 Murad III (4 July 1546, Manisa Palace, Manisa – 16 January 1595, Topkapı Palace, Istanbul, buried in Murad III Mausoleum, Hagia Sophia)
 Fatma Sultan (1559 – October 1580, Istanbul, buried in Siyavuş Pasha Mosque), married in 1573 to Damad Kanijeli Siyavuş Pasha.

In literature and popular culture 
 A fictionalized version of the life and death of Nurbanu Sultan appeared in Marina Fiorato's the Venetian Contract, in which she was depicted as the niece of Doge Sebastiano Venier and the mother of Freya, who is the protagonist in the novel.
 Nurbanu Sultan is the protagonist in The Mapmaker's Daughter by Katherine Nouri Hughes, which takes the form of Nurbanu Sultan's memoirs.
 She was portrayed by Turkish actress Merve Boluğur in television series  Muhteşem Yüzyıl.

See also 
Ottoman dynasty
Ottoman family tree
List of Valide Sultans
List of consorts of the Ottoman Sultans

References

Bibliography 
 Arbel, Benjamin, Nur Banu (c. 1530-1583): A Venetian Sultana?, Turcica, 24 (1992), pp. 241–259.
 
 A.D. Alderson, The Structure of the Ottoman Dynasty. Clarendon Press, Oxford, 1956.
 Almanach de Gotha: annuaire généalogique, diplomatique et statistique, Justes Perthes, Gotha, 1880–1944.
 
 Burke's Royal Families of the World, Volume II: Africa & The Middle East, Burke's Peerage Ltd., London, 1980.
 A.H. de Groot, s.v. in Encyclopaedia of Islam vol.8 p. 124
 Yılmaz Öztuna, Devletler ve Hanedanlar, Turkiye 1074-1990, Ankara, 1989.
 Osman Selâheddin Osmanoğlu, Osmanli Devleti'nin Kuruluşunun 700. Yılında Osmanlı Hanedanı, Islâm Tarih, Sanat ve Kültür Araştırma Vakfı (ISAR), Istanbul, 1999.
 Emine Fuat Tugay, Three Centuries: Family Chronicles of Turkey and Egypt, Oxford, 1963.

External links 
 Women Leaders in Power

1520s births
1583 deaths
People from Paros
16th-century consorts of Ottoman sultans
Valide sultan
Sultanate of Women